The Greenberg Variations is the fifth solo album by American composer and producer Kramer, released on March 25, 2003 by Tzadik Records.

Track listing

Personnel
Adapted from the liner notes to The Greenberg Variations.

 Kramer – instruments, musical arrangement, production, engineering
 Heung-Heung Chin – design
 Scott Hull – mastering
 Michael Macioce – photography
 Kazumori Sigiyama – executive producer
 John Zorn – executive producer

Release history

References 

2003 albums
Kramer (musician) albums
Albums produced by Kramer (musician)
Tzadik Records albums